Guangshan Jingju Temple (simplified Chinese: 净居寺; traditional Chinese: 凈居寺; pinyin: Jìngjū Sì), located in Guangshan County, Henan Province, China, also known as "Emperor entitled Brahma Temple", is the birthplace of Guangshan Jingju Temple Gate of China's first Buddhist sect, Tiantai Sect. In the fifth year of Tianbao in the Northern Qi Dynasty (554 A.D.), the eminent monk Huisi came to Dasu Mountain in Guangzhou to build a nunnery and open an altar to preach. Song Zhenzong's inscription "Emperor entitled Brahma Temple" is carved with five large-character plaques, which are still embedded on the door. The Daxiong Hall in the temple is a Ming Dynasty building. There are still more than 30 steles inscribed by historical celebrities and scholars such as the "Emperor's powdered gold" stele in Wanli of the Ming Dynasty, and the "Reconstruction Stele of Dasushan Brahma Temple" in Kangxi of Qing Dynasty. The stele of Su Shi's poems (Song dynasty) on visiting Jingju Temple is also conserved within the temple.

Monks 
"Monks account for most of people in world's famous mountain". The Jingju Mountain where the Jingju Temple is located was a place for Maitreya Buddha to sermon. It is the birthplace of Tiantai Sect of Buddhism. There were many famous monks here in history of Buddhism. Based on ancient literature "Buddhism in the Tang Dynasty of China", "Dictionary of Chinese Names", "Chinese Temples and Bodhisattvas", "Guangshan County Chronicles" of the Ming, Qing, and Republic of China, and relevant materials at China and abroad, the famous monks here included but not limited to:

Huisi (515-577 AD) was a monk of the Northern and Southern dynasties, the founder of Jingju Temple, the third ancestor of Tiantai Sect in China, and the teacher of Zhiyi, the actual founder of Tiantai Sect (ranked fourth), there is a saying in the Jiangsu and Zhejiang regions of our country, Taiwan, as well as foreign countries in Japan and Southeast Asia: "Confucius, the sage of literature, Guan Yu, the master of martial arts, and Huisi, the Buddha of Tiantai".

Zhiyi was a monk in Sui Dynasty was the heir of monk Huisi, the second generation monk of Jingju Temple, and the actual founder of Tiantai sect of Chinese Buddhism. He was known as: "Tiantai Buddha". "Dictionary of Chinese Names" introduces that Zhiyi's common surname is Chen, and his style name is De'an. Lost two parents at the age of eight, and became a monk at Guoyuan Temple in Xiangzhou. In the first year of Chen Tianjia (560 AD), at the age of 23, he came to Dasu Mountain in Guangzhou to worship Huisi as his teacher. He learned Zen and practiced the Dharma Samadhi. He succeeded in studying Buddhism in the seventh year of Chen Taijian peoriod (AD 567).

Dao'an (AD 654–717) was a monk of the Rhythm School in the Tang Dynasty, he later merged with Zen Buddhism, also known as Zen Master Dao'an. Dao'an is the founder of Jingju Temple. According to historical records, he personally presided over the construction of Jingju Temple in Dasu Mountain, which was originally named Jingju Temple. "Dictionary of Chinese Names" introduces: Dao'an's common surname is Tang, and he lived in Yingzhou (now Xuchang, Henan). age 30). Dao'an was a young man who was eager to learn, and later he became a monk.

References

Temples in China
Temples
Buddhist temples
Buddhist temples in China